The 2006 women's road cycling season was the third for the Equipe Nürnberger Versicherung, an 2006 UCI women's cycling team.

Roster
  Katherine Bates (18/05/1982)   
  Claudia Hecht (01/04/1984)  
  Claudia Häusler (17/11/1985)
  Tina Liebig (28/04/1980)   
  Eva Lutz (28/05/1979)  
  Regina Schleicher (21/03/1974)   
  Anke Wichmann (28/08/1975)   
  Oenone Wood (24/09/1980)   
  Trixi Worrack (28/09/1981)
Not UCI registered
  Sabine Fischer (08/11/1986)
  Claudia Stumpf (12/03/1984)
Source

Season victories

Results in major races

UCI World Ranking

The team finished third in the UCI ranking for teams.

References

2006 UCI Women's Teams seasons
2006 in German sport
Noris Cycling